Leonardo de Benedetti (15 September 1898 – 16 October 1983) was an Italian Jew and physician who was interned in the Auschwitz concentration camp from February 1944 until its liberation in January 1945. After the end of the Second World War he and fellow inmate Primo Levi wrote Auschwitz Report, a factual report of conditions inside the camp.

References

External links

20th-century Italian Jews
The Holocaust in Italy
Holocaust historiography
Auschwitz concentration camp survivors
1898 births
1983 deaths